Hive Mind: How Your Nation's IQ Matters So Much More Than Your Own is a book by Garett Jones, published in 2015 by Stanford University Press. It explores the science behind the financial payoff of high Individual IQ and the related impact of thinking like a group. The book claims that a nation's average IQ is multiple times more important for the nation's prosperity than an individual's IQ is important for their overall prosperity. The logic is that collective IQ non-linearly improves a country's fortunes via multiple channels, such as better institutions, etc.

Synopsis

Da Vinci Effect 
The book relates personal intelligence to group intelligence with a concept the author calls the da Vinci Effect. This concept relates the general intelligence of an individual performing different tasks to the abilities of members of a group performing different tasks.

References 

2015 non-fiction books
Stanford University Press books
Intelligence analysis